{{DISPLAYTITLE:C15H12N2O}}
The molecular formula C15H12N2O (molar mass: 236.27 g/mol) may refer to:

 Benzodiazepine (core structure)
 Carbamazepine
 Nafimidone

Molecular formulas

sr:C15H12N2O2